Nikolay Nikolayevich Semyonov (or Semënov),  (– 25 September 1986) (often referred to in English as Semenoff, Semenov, Semionov, or Semyonova) was a Soviet physicist and chemist.  Semyonov was awarded the 1956 Nobel Prize in Chemistry for his work on the mechanism of chemical transformation.

Life and career
Semyonov was born in Saratov, the son of Elena Dmitrieva and Nikolai Alex Semyonov. He graduated from the department of physics of Petrograd University (1913–1917), where he was a student of Abram Fyodorovich Ioffe. In 1918, he moved to Samara, where he was enlisted into Kolchak's White Army during Russian Civil War.

Semyonov published his first research paper in 1916 and became a lecturer at the University of Tomsk in western Siberia.

After graduating from Saint Petersburg State University, he worked as an assistant and lecturer at the Tomsk and Tomsk University Institute of Technology, where he published his first research paper in 1916.  He returned to western Siberia, Petrograd and took charge of the electron phenomena laboratory of the Petrograd Physico-Technical Institute in 1920.  He also became the vice-director of the institute. In 1921, he married philologist Maria Boreishe-Liverovsky (student of Zhirmunsky). She died two years later. On September 15-1924, Nikolay married Maria's niece, Natalia Nikolaevna Burtseva. They had two children, one son Yurii Nikolaevich and one daughter Ludmilla Nikolaevna.

During that difficult time, Semyonov, together with Pyotr Kapitsa, discovered a way to measure the magnetic field of an atomic nucleus (1922). Later the experimental setup was improved by Otto Stern and Walther Gerlach and became known as Stern–Gerlach experiment.

In 1925, Semyonov, together with Yakov Frenkel, studied kinetics of condensation and adsorption of vapors. In 1927, he studied ionisation in gases and published an important book, Chemistry of the Electron. In 1928, he, together with Vladimir Fock, created a theory of thermal disruptive discharge of dielectrics.

In 1927, Semyonov studied the ionization of gases, the chemistry of the electron. In 1928, he created the theory of the broken discharge of dielectrics with Valdímir Fok.

He lectured at the Petrograd Polytechnical Institute and was appointed Professor in 1928. In 1931, he organized the Institute of Physical Chemistry of the USSR Academy of Sciences (which moved to Chernogolovka in 1943) and became its first director. In 1932, he became a full member of the Soviet Academy of Sciences.

The ideas of Semyonov have been applied in the science of reaction and production of polymerization reactions. His ideas are also applied in catalysis studies in biological systems.

Semyonov married  Natalya Nikolaevna Semyonov and together they both have a son and a daughter.
Semyonov died on September 25, 1986 in Moscow, and was buried at the Novodevichy Cemetery.

Significant works

Semyonov's outstanding work on the mechanism of chemical transformation includes an exhaustive analysis of the application of the chain theory to varied reactions (1934–1954) and, more significantly, to combustion processes. He proposed a theory of degenerate branching, which led to a better understanding of the phenomena associated with the induction periods of oxidation processes. He spent most of his career focusing and developing the field of chemical chain reactions.

Semyonov wrote two important books outlining his work. Chemical Kinetics and Chain Reactions was published in 1934, with an English edition in 1935. It was the first book in the U.S.S.R. to develop a detailed theory of unbranched and branched chain reactions in chemistry. Some Problems of Chemical Kinetics and Reactivity, first published in 1954, was revised in 1958; there are also English, American, German, and Chinese editions. He is the only Soviet/Russian Chemistry Nobel Laureate, who received the Nobel Prize in Chemistry (together with Sir Cyril Norman Hinshelwood) for his work in 1956. 

Semyonov had long been a supporter of the Communist Party and the Soviet Union. After the Bulletin of the Atomic Scientists accused the Soviet Union of heavy scientific censorship in 1953, he coauthored the Soviet response which denied all accusations. He is also noted as being the most famous signatory to a 1971 public letter from Soviet scientists to United States president Richard Nixon, on displeasure in the murder trial of Angela Davis. 

Semyonov trained Russian organometallic chemist Alexandr Shilov, who discovered platinum catalyzed C-H activation.

Honours and awards
 Orders of Lenin, nine times (incl. 1945, 1953, 1956, 1966, 1971, 1976, 1981)
 Stalin Prize (1941, 1949)
 Honorary Member of the British Chemical Society (1943)
 Order of the Red Banner of Labour (1946)
 Honorary member of the Indian Academy of Sciences (1954)
 Nobel Prize in Chemistry (1956)
 Foreign Member of the Royal Society of London (1958)
 Member of the German Academy of Sciences Leopoldina (1959)
 Honorary member of the Hungarian Academy of Sciences (1961)
 Honorary member of the New York Academy of Sciences (1962)
 Foreign member of the United States National Academy of Sciences (1963)
 Honorary Member of the Romanian Academy (1965)
 Hero of Socialist Labour, twice (1966, 1976)
 Lomonosov Gold Medal (1969)
 Lenin Prize (1976)
 Order of the October Revolution (1986)
 Medal "In commemoration of the centenary of the birth of Vladimir Ilyich Lenin"
 Mendeleev Prize
 5 total badges of the Order of Lenin
 Honorary Member of The Soviet Academy of Sciences (1932)

Semyonov was also an Honorary Doctor of several universities: Oxford (1960), Brussels (1962), London (1965), Budapest Technical University (1965), Polytechnic Institute of Milan (1964) and others.

Legacy 
 In 1990, the IHF RAS was named after N. N. Semenov;
 In 1994, a memorial plaque was unveiled in honor of Nikolay Nikolaevich Semenov on the main building of the St. Petersburg State Polytechnic University (29 Politechnicheskaya Street);
 The memorial plaque is installed on the facade of the Main building of the A.F. Ioffe Institute of Physics and Technology in St. Petersburg (26 Politechnicheskaya str.).
 On July 27 1996 and one of the streets in the South-Western Administrative District of the city of Moscow on the territory of the district Yuzhnoye Butovo was given the name Academician Semenov Street;
 In Saratov , one of the streets is named after Semenov;
 In Tyumen , one of the streets is named after Semenov;
 A memorial plaque is installed on the house in Moscow at 24 Frunzenskaya Embankment, where Semenov spent his last years of life;
 The Presidium of the Russian Academy of Sciences has a Commission for the development of the scientific heritage of Academician N. N. Semenov;
 Airliner Airbus A321 (VQ-BOI) of the airline "Aeroflot" "N. Semenov";
 On April 5, 2019 in Moscow on the territory of National Research Nuclear University "MEPhI" a monument was erected by the sculptor Alexandra Mironova
 At the beginning of April 2022, a monument to Academician Nikolai Semenov was unveiled in Moscow on Kosygin Street, house 4.

See also
 Chain reaction
 Chemical kinetics
 Chemical reaction network theory
 Evans–Polanyi–Semenov principle

Reference

 Nikolay Semenov, https://persona.rin.ru/eng/view/f/0/28293/nikolay-semenov, Retrieved 27 October 2022
 Nikolay Semenov, https://www.nobelprize.org/prizes/chemistry/1956/semenov/biographical/, Retrieved 27 October 2022
 Nikolai Nikolayevich Semyonov, great physicist, chemist and mathematician, https://rinconeducativo.org/en/recursos-educativos/nikolai-nikolayevich-semionov-gran-fisico-quimico-y-matematico/, Retrieved 8 December
 Nikolay Semyonov, https://www.nndb.com/people/542/000100242/ Retrieved 2019(Uns. Date Format)

External links

  including the Nobel Lecture, 11 December 1956 Some Problems Relating to Chain Reactions and to the Theory of Combustion
 Semyonov's  Nobel Lecture Some Problems Relating to Chain Reactions and to the Theory of Combustion
 N.N. Semenov Institute of Chemical Physics
  Semyonov's Biography.
  Another Semyonov's Biography.

1896 births
1986 deaths
Scientists from Saratov
Saint Petersburg State University alumni
Academic staff of the Moscow Institute of Physics and Technology
Full Members of the USSR Academy of Sciences
Foreign Members of the Royal Society
Foreign associates of the National Academy of Sciences
Members of the French Academy of Sciences
Nobel laureates in Chemistry
Heroes of Socialist Labour
Recipients of the Order of Lenin
Stalin Prize winners
Lenin Prize winners
Recipients of the Lomonosov Gold Medal
Soviet chemists
Soviet physicists
Academic staff of Tomsk State University
Academic staff of Tomsk Polytechnic University
Members of the German Academy of Sciences Leopoldina
Members of the German Academy of Sciences at Berlin
Academic staff of Peter the Great St. Petersburg Polytechnic University
White movement people
Soviet Nobel laureates